Michelle Singletary is an American journalist. She is a columnist for the Washington Post. She won a 2021 Gerald Loeb Award for Commentary for "Sincerely, Michelle" in The Washington Post, and received the Gerald Loeb Lifetime Achievement Award in 2022.

Life 
She graduated from University of Maryland, College Park, and Johns Hopkins University. She wrote a series,  “Sincerely, Michelle,”

She has appeared on the Amanpour & Co,  Morning Edition, The Kojo Nnamdi Show, On Point, and The Long View. She participated in the OneTransaction Campaign.

Works 

 The 21-Day Financial Fast: Your Path to Financial Peace and Freedom.
 Spend well, live rich : how to get what you want with the money you have Random House, 
 Your money and your man : how you and Prince Charming can spend well and live rich Random House,

References

External links 

 Official Site of Michelle Singletary.
 2008 National Book Festival Podcast: Michelle Singletary:

American journalists
Living people
Year of birth missing (living people)
Place of birth missing (living people)
University of Maryland, College Park alumni
Johns Hopkins University alumni
The Washington Post people
American women columnists
Women business and financial journalists
American financial commentators
Gerald Loeb Award winners for Columns, Commentary, and Editorials
21st-century American women
Gerald Loeb Lifetime Achievement Award winners